Kajai (also Romanized as Kajā’ī; also known as Bajmīn) is a village in Bakesh-e Yek Rural District, in the Central District of Mamasani County, Fars Province, Iran. At the 2006 census, its population was 180, in 44 families.

References 

Populated places in Mamasani County